WOO HAH! was a hip hop festival that took place every year in Tilburg since 2014. The festival was being organised by Mojo Concerts and 013 Poppodium and used took place at an area called "Spoorzone" from 2014 to 2017. Since 2018, the festival had been moved to Safaripark Beekse Bergen in Hilvarenbeek.

The line-up existed of a combination of international artists and upcoming talent. The festival offered more than music e.g., fashion, sport and art. Besides that there was a skate hall where professional skaters demonstrated their skills and artists painted with graffiti during the festival.

In 2017 the festival grew from a one day event to a two day event which eventually in 2018 became a three day event.  
During the build-up phase, provided by the previous editions, the festival started to get subsidy from Brabant C. 

WOO HAH! took place since 2018 on a different location and increased the duration to a three day festival. In 2018 the first lustrum edition took place at Safaripark Beekse Bergen in Hilvarenbeek on the 13th, 14th and 15th of July

Due to the outbreak of COVID-19 virus, the 2020 edition got officially cancelled. Later that year it was announced that the 2021 edition also got cancelled.

On december 8th of 2021 it was announced that WOO HAH! is collaborating with the American festival organiser Rolling Loud. Rolling Loud is the largest hiphop festival brand in the world.

In November 2022, the organisation of WOO HAH! announced that it would continue as Rolling Loud and that the venue would move to Rotterdam Ahoy. In conjunction with the disappearance of the WOO HAH! name, festival director Ruud Lemmen announced that he would also be leaving the festival. The announcement that WOO HAH! would be disappearing from the festival circuit was met with much criticism from supporters.

Editions

References

Culture in Tilburg
Music festivals in the Netherlands
Events in Tilburg
Defunct music festivals